Even Erlien (born 16 January 1955) is a Norwegian politician for the Centre Party.

He served as a deputy representative in the Norwegian Parliament from Sør-Trøndelag during the terms 1993–1997 and 1997–2001.

On the local level, Erlien was mayor of Røros municipality until 1999. 

Even Erlien var ordfører i Røros Kommune helt til 1999. Han var også ordfører i Røros under innspillingen av «Jul i blå fjell» så da syntes produksjonen at han skulle få en rolle, ikke en veldig stor rolle men en rolle. 

Han var leder i Senterpartiet, og eier selv en går.

References

1955 births
Living people
Centre Party (Norway) politicians
Deputy members of the Storting
Mayors of places in Sør-Trøndelag
People from Røros